HMS Tartar has been the name of more than one ship of the British Royal Navy, and may refer to:
 , a 32-gun fifth rate launched in 1702. Rebuilt in 1733 as a 20-gun sixth rate, launched in 1734 and scrapped in 1755
 , a 28-gun sixth rate launched in 1756 and wrecked in 1797
 , a 32-gun fifth rate launched in 1801 and wrecked in 1811
 , a 36-gun fifth rate launched in 1814, reduced to receiving ship service in 1830, and scrapped in 1859
 , ordered as the Russian screw corvette Wojn from a shipyard on the Thames, but seized by Britain while under construction, launched in 1854 and scrapped in 1866
 , a torpedo cruiser launched in 1886 and sold in 1906
 , a destroyer launched in 1907 and sold in 1921
 , a destroyer launched in 1937 and sold in 1948
 , a frigate launched in 1960 and sold to Indonesia in 1984

Also
 HM 
 HM 
 Tartar, a privateer the French vessel Andromaque sank on 15 May 1779 
 
 

Royal Navy ship names